General elections were held in Japan on 19 April 1953. The result saw the ruling Liberal Party win 199 of the 466 seats. Voter turnout was 74.2%.

Results

By prefecture

References 

Japan
1953 elections in Japan
General elections in Japan
April 1953 events in Asia
Election and referendum articles with incomplete results